Amin Alhassan is a Ghanaian academic, journalist and public servant. He is the incumbent and seventeenth Director General of the Ghana Broadcasting Corporation. He succeeded Kwame Akuffo Anoff-Ntow on the role on 1 October 2019.

Early life and education 
Alhassan was born and raised in Tamale even though his parents hail from Savelugu. 

He had his early education at the Tishigu Anglican Primary School, and later the Tishigu Anglican Middle School in Tishigu, a suburb of Tamale. He had his secondary education at Navrongo Senior High School for his Ordinary Level Certificate (O-Level), and Tamale Senior High School for his Advanced Level Certificate (A-Level). He then proceeded to the Ghana Institute of Journalism for his tertiary education. He obtained his post graduate degrees from Concordia University and the University of Tampere.

Career 
After graduating from the Ghana Institute of Journalism, Alhassan joined the Ghana Broadcasting Corporation's GBC Radio News, and the Ghana News Agency. Following his postgraduate studies, he began as a lecturer at McGill University in 2003. In 2004 he joined York University in Toronto as an associate professor at the department of Communication Studies. He later joined the University for Development Studies in 2012, and became the founding dean of the Faculty of Agribusiness and Communication Sciences. He served as the Principal for the Wa campus in 2018, and in October 2019 he was appointed Director General of the Ghana Broadcasting Corporation.

Honours
In 2021 he was awarded the Most People Focused CEO award during the Human Resource Excellence Awards.

References 

Ghanaian civil servants
Year of birth missing (living people)
Living people
Academic staff of the University for Development Studies
Ghana Institute of Journalism alumni
Concordia University alumni
University of Tampere alumni
Tamale Senior High School alumni